The Green Party of Quebec fielded eleven candidates in the 1994 Quebec general election, none of whom were elected.

Candidates

Fabre: Rick Blatter
Rick Blatter was a Libertarian Party candidate in two federal elections during the 1990s. He ran provincially as a Green Party candidate in 1994 and has run for mayor of Laval on two occasions. In 1996, he wrote a public letter in support of a flat tax. Blatter was a vocal opponent of former Laval mayor Gilles Vaillancourt and had criticized the state of democracy in the city.

Mercier: Jean-François Labadie
Jean-François Labadie received 865 votes (2.79%), finishing fourth against Parti Québécois candidate Robert Perreault.

References

1994